Jim Obergefell (born 1966) is an American civil rights activist who was the lead plaintiff in the 2015 U.S. Supreme Court case Obergefell v. Hodges, which legalized same-sex marriage throughout the United States. Obergefell had sued the state of Ohio in 2013, due to that state's lack of legal recognition of Obergefell's marriage to his husband, John Arthur. Obergefell was the Democratic nominee for the 89th legislative district of the Ohio House of Representatives in the 2022 elections.

Early life 
Obergefell graduated from Sandusky High School in 1984 and went on to attend the University of Cincinnati, where he earned a degree in secondary education and German. He attended graduate school at Bowling Green State University. Out of college, he was a high school German teacher. In his mid-twenties, Obergefell came out to his eldest sister. At the time, his mother was dead, but the rest of his family was not too surprised by his announcement. While his father was not always supportive, Obergefell found a strong relationship  with his aunt Paulette. The city council of Cincinnati made April 28, the day of the Oral Arguments, John Arthur Day as a tribute to the Supreme Court case from the two men who lived there together for two decades. The mayor of the city, John Cranley, referred to Obergefell as a "historic figure" for their city and the country. In 2015, Foreign Policy named Obergefell one of its 2015 Global Thinkers. In the same year, Out magazine also named Obergefell on its 2015 Out 100 list. Obergefell was also appointed to be a member of the National Advisory Board for the GLBT Historical Society and the Board of Advisors for the Mattachine Society of Washington DC. Obergefell has also been honored by the ACLU of Southern California, the National Gay and Lesbian Chamber of Commerce, and the Santa Clara University School of Law.

References

Living people
1966 births
21st-century American educators
21st-century American male writers
Activists from Ohio
American civil rights activists
Bowling Green State University alumni
Gay men
LGBT people from Ohio
American LGBT rights activists
People from Sandusky, Ohio
University of Cincinnati alumni